Rider in Blue (Swedish: Ryttare i blått) is a 1959 Swedish mystery thriller film directed by Arne Mattsson and starring Annalisa Ericson, Gunnel Broström and Bengt Brunskog. It was shot at the Centrumateljéerna Studios in Stockholm and on location at Bromma Airport and Strömsholm Castle. The film's sets were designed by the art director Bibi Lindström. It was the third in a series of five films featuring the husband and wife detective team John and Kajsa Hillman. It was followed by The Lady in White in 1962.

Cast
 Annalisa Ericson as 	Kajsa Hillman
 Gunnel Broström as 	Elly Weinestam
 Bengt Brunskog as 	Douglas Weinestam
 Gio Petré as Git Malmström
 Björn Bjelfvenstam as 	Henrik Löwe 
 Mona Malm as Kerstin Renman
 Erik Hell as Kurt Forsberg
 Lena Granhagen as Sonja Svensson
 Nils Hallberg as Freddy Sjöström
 Karl-Arne Holmsten as John Hillman
 Lauritz Falk as 	Axel Weber
 Kotti Chave as 	Sune Öhrgren
 Tommy Nilson as 	Andersson 
 Lennart Lindberg as 	Nelson
 Karl Erik Flens as 	Jonsson
 Olle Grönstedt as 	Battalion Veterinary
 Curt Löwgren as Parat
 John Melin as Åberg
 Bengt Gillberg as 	Palm
 Olof Huddén as 	Rutger von Schöffer
 Inger Liljefors as 	Eva
 Gunilla Nachmanson as 	Blue Star
 Brita Ponsbach as 	Blue Star
 Pia Rydvall as 	Blue Star
 Eva-Britt Johnson as 	Blue Star 
 Björn Gustafson as 	Boman, Constable 
 Gerd Hystad as 	Air Hostess 
 Ellika Mann as 	Veterinarian's Wife 
 Bellan Roos as Vivianne, Waitress 
 Hanny Schedin as 	Cook 
 Solveig Ternström as 	Housemaid at Ribersvik
 Sigvard Törnqvist as 	Captain 
 Sven Wollter as 	Press Photographer 
 Birger Åsander as 	Taxi Driver

References

Bibliography 
  Cowie, Peter Françoise Buquet, Risto Pitkänen & Godfried Talboom. Scandinavian Cinema: A Survey of the Films and Film-makers of Denmark, Finland, Iceland, Norway, and Sweden. Tantivy Press, 1992.
 Krawc, Alfred. International Directory of Cinematographers, Set- and Costume Designers in Film: Denmark, Finland, Norway, Sweden (from the beginnings to 1984). Saur, 1986.

External links 
 

1959 films
1950s mystery thriller films
Swedish mystery thriller films
1950s Swedish-language films
Films directed by Arne Mattsson
Films set in Stockholm
1950s Swedish films